Vladimir Yakovlevich Tsvetov (July 11, 1933, Moscow — October 5, 1993, Tokyo) was an International observer, TV commentator, orientalist, japanist. Son of the writer, poet and journalist Yakov Tsvetov (Tseitlin) (1909-1977).

In 1957, Vladimir Tsvetov graduated from the Institute of Oriental Languages at Moscow State University. Lomonosov (specialty - historian) and began to work in the media. He began his career as an employee of the Foreign Service, telling the people of Japan about life in the USSR.

Since January 1976 to October 1983 he worked in Japan as a correspondent for Soviet television.

Active participant of perestroika, columnist of the newspaper Moskovskiye Novosti. Vladimir Yakovlevich Tsvetov, being in Japan, suddenly died in one of the Tokyo hospitals on October 5, 1993. The only journalist whose farewell ceremony was held at the House of the Russian Press.

He was buried at the Vvedenskoye Cemetery.

He was posthumously awarded the Medal Defender of a Free Russia.

References

External links
 Владимир Яковлевич Цветов   (1933—1993)
 Московские могилы

1933 births
1993 deaths
Mass media people from Moscow
Soviet journalists
Soviet writers
Soviet orientalists
20th-century Russian journalists